Bradwell may refer to:

Places

England
 Bradwell, Devon
 Bradwell, Derbyshire, a village in the Derbyshire Peak District
 Bradwell, Norfolk, Great Yarmouth 
 Bradwell, Staffordshire

Buckinghamshire
 Bradwell and New Bradwell; each a village, district and civil parish now part of Milton Keynes
 Bradwell Abbey, an ancient monument in Milton Keynes

Essex
 Bradwell Juxta Coggeshall, a village and civil parish in Essex, England
 Bradwell-on-Sea, a village and civil parish
 Bradwell Waterside, a small hamlet 
 Bradwell nuclear power station

North America
 Bradwell, Saskatchewan, Canada
 Bradwell Bay Wilderness, a designated wilderness area in the state of Oklahoma, US

People
 Tom Driberg, Baron Bradwell (1905-1976), British journalist and politician
 Chris Bradwell (born 1983), US athlete
 James B. Bradwell (1828-1907), US lawyer and judge
 Mike Bradwell (born 1986), Canadian athlete
 Myra Bradwell (1831-1894), US publisher and political activist
 Oliver Bradwell (born 1992), US athlete

Other uses
 Bradwell Institute, a public high school in Hinesville, Georgia, US
 Bradwell (car), a cyclecar by the British manufacturer Bradwell & Company
 Bradwell Episcopal Area, an episcopal area within the Diocese of Chelmsford.

See also
 Broadwell (disambiguation)